The Archdeacon of Chester is a senior ecclesiastical officer in the diocese of Chester. The area in which she, or he, has statutory duties is the Archdeaconry of Chester – those duties include some pastoral care and disciplinary supervision of the clergy in that area.

The archdeaconry was created before 1135 in (what was in 1222) the Diocese of Coventry (that diocese was called Coventry and Lichfield from 1228 and then Lichfield and Coventry from 1539); it formed part of the Diocese of Chester upon her creation in 1541 and remains so today.

List of archdeacons

High Medieval
Halmar
William
Robert (I)
bef. 1135–aft. 1135: Richard Peche (later Bishop of Coventry)
Adam de Stafford
–1149: William de Villars
1149–1152: Robert (II)
Hugh
Thomas de Sancto Nicholao
bef. 1222–aft. 1231: Ralph de Maidstone (also Dean of Hereford from 1231)
In 1228, Coventry diocese became the Diocese of Coventry and Lichfield.
bef. 1245–1246 (res.): Silvester de Everdon (became Bishop of Carlisle)
bef. 1248–aft. 1248: Richard
bef. 1253–aft. 1253: John Basing
Simon de Albo Monasterio, Abbot of St Werburgh's Abbey
bef. 1271–aft. 1271: Adam de Stanford or Stafford
bef. 1279–aft. 1284: Jordan of Wimborne/de Wimburn
bef. 1289–1315 (d.): Robert de Radewell

Late Medieval
bef. 1315–bef. 1341 (d.): Richard de Havering
26 April–10 December 1330: John de Ufford (royal grant revoked)
29 January 1341–aft. August 1342 (res.): Michael Northburgh
August 1342–14 July 1348 (d.): Pedro Cardinal Gòmez de Barroso  (cardinal-bishop of Sabina) 
30 October 1348–bef. 1385 (res.): William de Navesby
16 October 1385 – 11 March 1387 (exch.): Nicholas Slake
11 March 1387–bef. 1390 (d.): John de Herlaston
22 February 1388–?: John Ganville (ineffective royal grant)
10 July 1390 – 15 May 1413 (exch.): William de Neuhagh
15 May 1413–bef. 1423 (d.): Henry de Halsall
7 March 1423–bef. 1425 (d.): David Price
5 July 1425–bef. 1433 (d.): Richard Stanley
6 March 1433–bef. 1449 (d.): John Burdet
26 April 1449–bef. 1454 (d.): George Radclyf
19 January 1454–bef. 1462 (d.): Sir Edward Stanley
5 November 1462–bef. 1467 (d.): Thomas St Just
10 October 1467–bef. 1474 (d.): Henry Ince
9 May 1474 – 1478 (res.): John Morton
bef. 1478–bef. 1485 (d.): James Stanley
5 June 1485–bef. 1493 (d.): Christopher Talbot
11 February 1493 – 1499 (d.): Edmund Chaderton, Archdeacon of Salisbury (also Archdeacon of Totnes)
28 August 1499 – 1519 (res.): John Vesey

17 November 1519 – 1522 (res.): Cuthbert Tunstall
11 November 1522 – 20 May 1541 (surr.): William Knight
In 1539, the Diocese of Coventry and Lichfield was renamed to Lichfield and Coventry.
In 1541, the Diocese of Chester was created and Chester became part of the new diocese.

Early modern
5 August 1541 – 1554 (deprived): John Birde, Bishop of Chester
bef. 1559–1559 (deprived): Robert Perceval (deprived)
aft. 1559–aft. 1562: Robert Perceval/Percival (restored)
bef. 1566–bef. 1595 (d.): Robert Rogers
3 January 1596–bef. 1619 (res.): Cuthbert Bellott
16 January 1619 – 5 February 1656 (d.): George Snell
19 October 1660–bef. 1667 (d.): John Carter
6 November 1666 – 7 April 1686 (d.): William Finmore
12 April 1686 – 17 April 1695 (d.): John Allen
30 April 1695 – 15 September 1707 (d.): Edmund Entwisle
February 1708–30 June 1727 (d.): John Thane
12 September 1727 – 2 February 1747 (d.): Lewis Stephens
22 April 1747 – 13 April 1751 (d.): William Powell
20 April 1751 – 1 October 1785 (d.): Abel Ward
21 January–20 November 1786 (res.): George Taylor
27 November 1786 – 24 February 1797 (d.): George Travis
11 March 1797 – 29 December 1800 (d.): Thomas Breithweite
17 January 1801–bef. 1847 (d.): Unwin Clarke
23 February 1847 – 7 June 1865 (d.): Isaac Wood
July 1865 - 29 August 1866 (d.): Edward Woolnough

Late modern
September 18661867 (d.): Richard Greenall (11 May 1806 – 27 November 1867)
1867–1871 (res.): William Pollock (22 April 1812 – 11 October 1873)
1871–1876 (res.): Edward Johnson
1877–1886 (res.): John Darby
1886–23 July 1914 (d.): Edward Barber
1914–14 March 1934 (d.): Paige Cox
1934–1937 (ret.): Norman Tubbs, Assistant Bishop
1937–1965 (ret.): Richard Burne (afterwards archdeacon emeritus)
1965–1975 (ret.): Leslie Fisher (afterwards archdeacon emeritus)
1975–1988 (ret.): Leslie Williams
1988–1993 (res.): Michael Gear
1993–1994 (res.): Geoffrey Turner
1994–2002 (ret.): Christopher Hewetson (afterwards archdeacon emeritus)
2002–2010 (res.): Donald Allister
September 2010–present: Michael Gilbertson

References

Sources

Lists of Anglicans
 
Lists of English people